Take Time is the debut EP by American R&B singer and songwriter Giveon, released by Epic Records on March 27, 2020. On the US Billboard Heatseekers chart, it was ranked as number one for three weeks in a row, beginning with January 16, 2021. The EP later peaked at number 35 on the Billboard 200. On March 12, 2021, Take Time was nominated for Best R&B Album at the 63rd Annual Grammy Awards.

Critical reception

Robyn Mowatt of Okayplayer said that "Take Time is one hell of a debut. It stands out amongst the auto-tuned, generic R&B music that many artists have become comfortable shelling out".

Nerisha Penrose of Elle called the EP "a masterpiece" and said that "World We Created" is "the song I can't stop singing".

Track listing
Credits adapted from Tidal

Charts

References

2020 debut EPs
Epic Records EPs
Giveon albums